A monoski is a single wide ski used for skiing on snow.  The same boots, bindings, and poles are used as in alpine skiing. Unlike in snowboarding, both feet face forward, rather than sideways to the direction of travel. Similar equipment includes the skwal and the teleboard, with feet in tandem formation (one ahead of the other).

Monoskiing was invented in the late 1950s by Dennis Phillips at Hyak, Washington using a single water ski and bear trap bindings. Surfer Mike Doyle promoted the monoski in the early 1970s, after which monoskiing's relative popularity slowly increased, but the interest eventually waned in favor of snowboarding.

Recently the popularity of monoskiing has increased, particularly in France and in the United States largely due to technological advances in the design of the ski. As with alpine skis the carved shape of the ski has meant easier turns, and as a result, skiers are finding the transition to monoskis less daunting.

Festivals 
Fans of monoskiing arrange festivals during the season to try out new skis and compete in various competitions. 
 In France one of the most popular is the "Mondial de Monoski"
 Also in France is the tongue-in-cheek 1980's themed "Monoski World Championships" held each April in Val d'Isere.
 In the United States this is the "Monopalooza"
 In Colorado, United States this is the "Cinco de Mono"

External links

 http://monoski-france.com/ is the French monoski association. It is the biggest community and organizer of the Mondial de Monoski
 http://www.monoski.net/  is a US-based site with information and reviews for everyone provided by the US Monoskiers
 http://monoskis.co.uk/  is a British site that aims to inform and promote monoskiing to the UK and provides new and used monoskis to buy
 http://www.realvikingsmonoski.com/  is a Swedish site with monoski information, photos and videos

Skiing equipment
Sliding vehicles